Richard Kruspe (born Sven Kruspe; 24 June 1967) is a German musician. He is the lead guitarist of the Neue Deutsche Härte band Rammstein, as well as the lead singer and lead guitarist of the US-based industrial metal band Emigrate.

Early life
Sven Kruspe was born in Wittenberge (then part of East Germany). He later changed his first name to Richard, believing that anyone should be able to change their own name. He has two older sisters and an older brother. His parents divorced when he was young, and his mother remarried; Kruspe did not get along with his stepfather. The family moved to the village of Weisen when Kruspe was young. Because of his poor relationship with his stepfather, Kruspe often ran away from home in his early teens, sleeping on park benches.

In a 2014 interview with Metal Hammer, he commented on life in East Germany, stating: "The thing about East Germany is that it was great to grow up there, until you were 12. You were presented with the illusion of a very healthy society, which worked unless you asked questions – and you don't ask questions until you're 12."

At the age of 16, Kruspe and some friends visited Czechoslovakia, where he bought a guitar, originally planning to sell it. He then met a girl who saw him with the guitar and insisted he plays the instrument. When Kruspe hit random notes in frustration, the girl commented it was "beautiful" and that inspired him to play the guitar.

Career

In 1985, bored with the apathetic music scene in his hometown, Kruspe moved to East Berlin and lived on Lychener Straße, where he "made music all day". For two years, he lived in an apartment with a drum kit and a guitar and made music by himself as he did not know anybody there. "It was a lonely time", according to Kruspe, but he used it to explore music.

On 10 October 1989, before the fall of the Berlin Wall, Kruspe was riding on the subway. After coming back above ground, he found himself in the middle of a political demonstration. He was hit on the head, which caused moderate damage to his right eye, and arrested just for being there and thrown in jail for six days. Once out of jail, he decided to leave East Germany. Because of the Eastern Bloc, he entered West Germany by traveling through Czechoslovakia, Hungary and Austria. When the Berlin Wall came down, he moved back east of Berlin.

Kruspe's first band, Das Elegante Chaos, was formed in the late 1980s. The band played live with other bands such as First Arsch (in which Till Lindemann was a drummer). In 1989, when Kruspe was 22, some songs were recorded by the band; these songs were later released in 2011 on the album Lyrik by Dachboden-Records. Seeking a more independent experience, Kruspe formed Orgasm Death Gimmick, which operated between 1991 and 1993; Orgasm Death Gimmick released three demo tapes, and a promotional tape through their label, Wydoks, before disbanding.

During his early career, Kruspe also played with other bands, such as First Arsch. Finally, Rammstein was formed in 1994, when Kruspe, who lived with Oliver Riedel and Christoph Schneider at the time, was looking for a new band in which to create a new style of music.

Personal life

Kruspe married South African actress Caron Bernstein on 29 October 1999. The ceremony was Jewish, and Kruspe composed the music for it. He took the name Richard Kruspe-Bernstein during their marriage. He moved from Berlin to New York in 2001 to live closer to Bernstein, but they separated in 2004, and he reverted back to his original last name. He moved back to Berlin in 2011.

Discography

Rammstein 
 Herzeleid (1995)
 Sehnsucht (1997)
 Mutter (2001)
 Reise, Reise (2004)
 Rosenrot (2005)
 Liebe ist für alle da (2009)
 Rammstein (2019)
 Zeit (2022)

Emigrate 
 Emigrate (2007)
 Silent So Long (2014) 
 A Million Degrees (2018)
 The Persistence of Memory (2021)

References

External links

Rammstein website
Emigrate website 

1967 births
Living people
People from Wittenberge
German heavy metal guitarists
German male guitarists
German heavy metal singers
German male singers
Lead guitarists
Rammstein members
German industrial musicians
Emigrate (band) members
Industrial metal musicians
East German defectors